This list of Sedum species shows the accepted species names within the genus Sedum, of which there are about 460.

Alphabetical list of species 

Sedum abchasicum 
Sedum acre  – wall-pepper, goldmoss sedum, goldmoss stonecrop, biting stonecrop
Sedum actinocarpum 
Sedum adolphi  – Golden Sedum, Adolph's Sedum, Golden Glow Sedum
Sedum aetnense 
Sedum alamosanum 
Sedum albomarginatum  – Feather River stonecrop
Sedum album  – white stonecrop
Sedum alexanderi 
Sedum alfredii 
Sedum allantoides 
Sedum alpestre 
Sedum alsinifolium 
Sedum × amecamecanum 
Sedum andegavense 
Sedum andinum 
Sedum anglicum  – English stonecrop
Sedum annuum  – annual stonecrop
Sedum apoleipon 
Sedum aquilanum 
Sedum arenarium 
Sedum argunense 
Sedum assyriacum 
Sedum atratum  – dark stonecrop
Sedum australe 
Sedum aytacianum 
Sedum backebergii 
Sedum baileyi 
Sedum baleensis 
Sedum balfourii 
Sedum barbeyi 
Sedum barcense 
Sedum batallae 
Sedum batesii 
Sedum × battandieri 
Sedum beauverdii 
Sedum bellum 
Sedum bergeri 
Sedum berillonanum 
Sedum berunii 
Sedum bhattacharyyae 
Sedum blepharophyllum 
Sedum boninense 
Sedum bonnieri 
Sedum booleanum 
Sedum borissovae 
Sedum borschii 
Sedum botterii 
Sedum bourgaei 
Sedum brachetii 
Sedum bracteatum 
Sedum brevifolium 
Sedum brissemoretii 
Sedum bulbiferum 
Sedum burrito  – baby burro's-tail
Sedum caducum 
Sedum caeruleum 
Sedum calcaratum 
Sedum calcicola 
Sedum callichroum 
Sedum candolleanum 
Sedum carinatifolium 
Sedum carnegiei 
Sedum caroli-henrici 
Sedum catorce 
Sedum celatum 
Sedum celiae 
Sedum cepaea  – pink stonecrop
Sedum cespitosum 
Sedum chauveaudii 
Sedum chazaroi 
Sedum chihuahuense 
Sedum chingtungense 
Sedum chloropetalum 
Sedum chrysicaulum 
Sedum chuhsingense 
Sedum churchillianum 
Sedum citrinum 
Sedum clausenii 
Sedum clavatum 
Sedum clavifolium 
Sedum cockerellii  – Cockerell's stonecrop
Sedum commixtum 
Sedum compactum 
Sedum concarpum 
Sedum confertiflorum 
Sedum confusum  – lesser Mexican-stonecrop
Sedum constantini 
Sedum conzattii 
Sedum copalense 
Sedum cormiferum 
Sedum correptum 
Sedum corymbosum 
Sedum corynephyllum 
Sedum craigii 
Sedum crassularia 
Sedum creticum 
Sedum cupressoides 
Sedum cuspidatum 
Sedum cymatopetalum 
Sedum cyprium 
Sedum daigremontianum 
Sedum danjoense 
Sedum dasyphyllum  – thick-leaved stonecrop
Sedum debile  – orpine stonecrop, weakstem stonecrop
Sedum decipiens 
Sedum dendroideum  – tree stonecrop
Sedum × derbezii 
Sedum didymocalyx 
Sedum dielsii 
Sedum diffusum 
Sedum diminutum 
Sedum dimorphophyllum 
Sedum dispermum 
Sedum divergens  – spreading stonecrop
Sedum dongzhiense 
Sedum drymarioides 
Sedum dugueyi 
Sedum dulcinomen 
Sedum duthiei 
Sedum eastwoodiae  – Red Mountain stonecrop
Sedum ebracteatum 
Sedum ecalcaratum 
Sedum edwardsii 
Sedum elatinoides 
Sedum elburzense 
Sedum emarginatum 
Sedum × engadinense 
Sedum engleri 
Sedum epidendrum 
Sedum erici-magnusii 
Sedum eriocarpum 
Sedum erlangerianum 
Sedum ermenekensis 
Sedum × erraticum 
Sedum erythrospermum 
Sedum euxinum 
Sedum fanjingshanense 
Sedum farinosum 
Sedum feddei 
Sedum fedtschenkoi 
Sedum filipes 
Sedum fischeri 
Sedum flaccidum 
Sedum flavidum 
Sedum formosanum 
Sedum forreri 
Sedum forrestii 
Sedum fragrans 
Sedum franchetii 
Sedum frutescens 
Sedum × fuereri 
Sedum fui 
Sedum furfuraceum 
Sedum fuscum 
Sedum fusiforme 
Sedum gagei 
Sedum gattefossei 
Sedum giajae 
Sedum glabrum 
Sedum glaebosum 
Sedum glassii 
Sedum glaucophyllum  – cliff stonecrop
Sedum globuliflorum 
Sedum glomerifolium 
Sedum goldmanii 
Sedum gracile 
Sedum grammophyllum 
Sedum grandipetalum 
Sedum grandyi 
Sedum greggii 
Sedum grisebachii 
Sedum griseum 
Sedum guadalajaranum 
Sedum guatemalense 
Sedum gypsicola 
Sedum gypsophilum 
Sedum hakonense 
Sedum hangzhouense 
Sedum havardii  – Havard's stonecrop
Sedum heckelii 
Sedum hemsleyanum 
Sedum hengduanense 
Sedum henrici-roberti 
Sedum hernandezii 
Sedum hintonii 
Sedum hintoniorum 
Sedum hirsutum 
Sedum hispanicum  – Spanish stonecrop
Sedum hoi 
Sedum holei 
Sedum holopetalum 
Sedum hultenii 
Sedum humifusum 
Sedum hypogaeum 
Sedum ichangensis 
Sedum ignescens 
Sedum incarum 
Sedum ince 
Sedum inconspicuum 
Sedum isidorum 
Sedum jaccardianum 
Sedum jahandiezii 
Sedum jaliscanum 
Sedum japonicum  – Tokyo sun stonecrop
Sedum jarocho 
Sedum jerzedowskii 
Sedum jiuhuashanense 
Sedum jiulungshanense 
Sedum jordanianum 
Sedum jujuyense 
Sedum jurgensenii 
Sedum keniense 
Sedum kiangnanense 
Sedum kiersteadiae 
Sedum kimnachii 
Sedum kingdonii 
Sedum kotschyanum 
Sedum koyuncui 
Sedum kristenii 
Sedum kuntsunianum 
Sedum kwanwuense 
Sedum laconicum 
Sedum lagascae 
Sedum lahovarianum 
Sedum lampusae 
Sedum lanceolatum  – lance-leaf stonecrop, lanceleaf stonecrop, spearleaf stonecrop
Sedum lancerottense 
Sedum latentibulbosum 
Sedum latifilamentum 
Sedum laxum  – roseflower stonecrop
Sedum leblancae 
Sedum leibergii  – Leiberg stonecrop
Sedum lenkoranicum 
Sedum leptophyllum 
Sedum leucocarpum 
Sedum liebmannianum 
Sedum lineare  – needle stonecrop
Sedum lipingense 
Sedum litoreum 
Sedum longifuniculatum 
Sedum longipes 
Sedum longuetae 
Sedum longyanense 
Sedum luchuanicum 
Sedum lucidum 
Sedum lumholtzii 
Sedum lungtsuanense 
Sedum luteoviride 
Sedum lutzii 
Sedum lydium  – least stonecrop
Sedum macdonaldii 
Sedum macdougallii 
Sedum madrense 
Sedum magae 
Sedum magellense 
Sedum magniflorum 
Sedum maireanum 
Sedum makinoi  – golden Japanese sedum
Sedum marmorense 
Sedum maurum 
Sedum melanantherum 
Sedum mellitulum 
Sedum mendozae 
Sedum mesoamericanum 
Sedum mexicanum  – Mexican stonecrop
Sedum meyeri-johannis 
Sedum meyranianum 
Sedum microcarpum 
Sedum microsepalum 
Sedum microstachyum  – small-spiked stonecrop
Sedum millspaughii 
Sedum minimum 
Sedum mocinoanum 
Sedum modestum 
Sedum moniliforme 
Sedum monregalense 
Sedum mooneyi 
Sedum moranense  – red stonecrop
Sedum moranii  – Rogue River stonecrop
Sedum morganianum  – donkey tail, burro tail
Sedum morrisonense 
Sedum mucizonia 
Sedum mukojimense 
Sedum multicaule 
Sedum multiceps  – pygmy Joshua tree, dwarf Joshua tree
Sedum muscoideum 
Sedum muyaicum 
Sedum nagasakianum 
Sedum nanchuanense 
Sedum nanifolium  – dwarf stonecrop
Sedum nanlingense 
Sedum nanum 
Sedum napiferum 
Sedum naviculare 
Sedum neovolcanicum 
Sedum nevadense 
Sedum nevii  – Nevius' stonecrop
Sedum niveum  – Davidson's stonecrop
Sedum nokoense 
Sedum nothodugueyi 
Sedum nudum 
Sedum nuttallii  – yellow stonecrop
Sedum oaxacanum 
Sedum obcordatum 
Sedum oblanceolatum  – oblongleaf stonecrop
Sedum obtrullatum 
Sedum obtusatum  – sierra stonecrop
Sedum obtusipetalum 
Sedum ocuilense 
Sedum oligocarpum 
Sedum oligospermum 
Sedum onychopetalum 
Sedum orbatum 
Sedum oreades 
Sedum oreganum  – Oregon stonecrop
Sedum oregonense  – cream stonecrop
Sedum oteroi 
Sedum oxycoccoides 
Sedum oxypetalum 
Sedum pacense 
Sedum pachucense 
Sedum pachyphyllum 
Sedum pagetodes 
Sedum pallidum 
Sedum palmeri  – Palmer's stonecrop
Sedum pampaninii 
Sedum papillicaulum 
Sedum paradisum  – Canyon Creek stonecrop
Sedum parvisepalum 
Sedum parvum 
Sedum patens 
Sedum × patrickii 
Sedum pedicellatum 
Sedum pentandrum 
Sedum pentapetalum 
Sedum pentastamineum 
Sedum perezdelarosae 
Sedum perpusillum 
Sedum perrotii 
Sedum peruvianum 
Sedum phyllanthum 
Sedum piaxtlaense 
Sedum piloshanense 
Sedum planifolium 
Sedum platysepalum 
Sedum plumbizincicola 
Sedum polystriatum 
Sedum polytrichoides 
Sedum porphyranthes 
Sedum pososepalum 
Sedum potosinum 
Sedum praealtum  – greater Mexican stonecrop, green cockscomb
Sedum × praegeri 
Sedum praesidis 
Sedum prasinopetalum 
Sedum pratoalpinum 
Sedum pringlei 
Sedum przewalskii 
Sedum pseudomulticaule 
Sedum pseudosubtile 
Sedum pubescens 
Sedum pulchellum  – widow's-cross
Sedum pulvinatum 
Sedum pumilum 
Sedum purdomii 
Sedum pusillum  – granite stonecrop
Sedum pyriseminum 
Sedum quadripetalum 
Sedum quevae 
Sedum radiatum  – granite stonecrop
Sedum ramentaceum 
Sedum raramuri 
Sedum raymondi 
Sedum reniforme 
Sedum renzopalmae 
Sedum reptans 
Sedum retusum 
Sedum rhodocarpum 
Sedum roberti 
Sedum robertsianum 
Sedum roborowskii 
Sedum rosthornianum 
Sedum rubens 
Sedum rubiginosum 
Sedum rupicola  – curvedleaf stonecrop
Sedum rupifragum 
Sedum ruwenzoriense 
Sedum sagittipetalum 
Sedum salazarii 
Sedum salvadorense 
Sedum samium 
Sedum sanhedrinum 
Sedum sarmentosum  – stringy stonecrop
Sedum sasakii 
Sedum satumense 
Sedum schizolepis 
Sedum scopulinum 
Sedum sedoides 
Sedum seelemannii 
Sedum sekiteiense 
Sedum semilunatum 
Sedum semiteres 
Sedum sexangulare  – tasteless stonecrop
Sedum shigatsense 
Sedum shitaiense 
Sedum sinforosanum 
Sedum sinoglaciale 
Sedum smallii 
Sedum somenii 
Sedum sorgerae 
Sedum spathulifolium  – Broadleaf stonecrop, Colorado stonecrop
Sedum spathulisepalum 
Sedum spiralifolium 
Sedum stahlii  – coral beads
Sedum stefco 
Sedum stellariifolium 
Sedum stelliforme  – Huachuca Mountain stonecrop
Sedum stenopetalum  – wormleaf stonecrop, yellow stonecrop
Sedum stimulosum 
Sedum strobiliforme 
Sedum suaveolens 
Sedum subgaleatum 
Sedum subtile 
Sedum susannae 
Sedum taiwanalpinum 
Sedum tamaulipense 
Sedum tarokoense 
Sedum tehuaztlense 
Sedum tenellum 
Sedum ternatum  – woodland stonecrop
Sedum tetractinum 
Sedum tianmushanense 
Sedum tortuosum 
Sedum torulosum 
Sedum tosaense 
Sedum treleasei 
Sedum triactina 
Sedum tricarpum 
Sedum trichospermum 
Sedum trichromum 
Sedum tristriatum 
Sedum triteli 
Sedum trollii 
Sedum trullipetalum 
Sedum tsiangii 
Sedum tsinghaicum 
Sedum tsonanum 
Sedum tuberculatum 
Sedum tuberiferum 
Sedum tuberosum 
Sedum ulricae 
Sedum ursi 
Sedum urvillei 
Sedum valens 
Sedum versadense 
Sedum versicolor 
Sedum victorianum 
Sedum villosum  – hairy stonecrop, purple stonecrop
Sedum vinicolor 
Sedum wangii 
Sedum wannanense 
Sedum weberbaueri 
Sedum wenchuanense 
Sedum wilczekianum 
Sedum wilsonii 
Sedum woronowii 
Sedum wrightii  – Wright's stonecrop
Sedum yildizianum 
Sedum yvesii 
Sedum zentaro-tashiroi

Formerly placed here

Now in Dudleya:
 Dudleya caespitosa (as S. cotyledon)
 Dudleya edulis (as S. edule)

Now in Hylotelephium:
 Hylotelephium spectabile (as S. spectabile)
 Hylotelephium telephioides (as S. telephioides)

Now in Rhodiola:
 Rhodiola rhodantha (as S. rhodanthum)
 Rhodiola rosea (as S. rhodiola, S. roanense, S. rosea)
 Rhodiola pachyclados ( S. pachyclados)

References

Bibliography 

 

Sedum
Sedum